Niedorajda is a 1937 Polish comedy film directed by Mieczysław Krawicz and produced by the Rex-Film studio. This comedy was also shown in the USA under the title Good for Nothing.

The film stars Adolf Dymsza playing a character who dresses up as a young girl, an alleged twin sister.

Cast
 Adolf Dymsza as Florek Wegorzek
 Renata Radojewska as Basia
 Michał Znicz as Pan Rowek
 Józef Orwid as Onufry Majewski
 Wanda Jarszewska as Onufry's wife
 Andrzej Bogucki as Zenon Majewski
 Seweryna Broniszówna as Aunt Agata
 Irena Skwierczyńska as Marianna, the cook
 Adolf Kantor as Michal Koperski, boxer
 Jerzy Kobusz as 'Mruk', Florek's friend
 Klemens Mielczarek as Boxer 'Kciukinir', Florek's friend
 Zofia Wilczynska as Chambermaid 
 Mieczyslaw Winkler as Antoni, Onufry's employee

References

External links

1937 films
1930s Polish-language films
Polish comedy films
1937 comedy films
Polish black-and-white films
Films directed by Mieczysław Krawicz